14ymedio is the first independent digital media outlet in Cuba. It was founded on May 21, 2014, by the Cuban blogger and activist Yoani Sánchez and the Cuban journalist Reinaldo Escobar.  The project started with a group of 12 reporters, whose objective was to produce a digital media outlet with different types of news. The newspaper contains news about Cuba and the world, in topics related to national politics, international politics, economy, culture, society, science and technology, and sports. It also publishes editorials, opinion articles, and interviews.

The name '14ymedio' characterizes the project in several ways. First, the number '14' is because the newspaper was born "on the fourteenth floor, in the fourteenth year of the new millennium". The letter 'Y' has been a constant characteristic in other projects of Yoani Sánchez, its founder, who also founded "Generación Y"; while 'medio' refers to the media and to the journalistic connotation of the project.

14ymedio is born in digital format in one of the countries with the lowest internet connectivity across the globe. Given the political situation in Cuba, where the government controls all media and regularly blocks access to websites that are hostile to its administration, the newspaper operates without access to the internet. The team uploads the information by using Wifi access from hotels.  Currently, most Cubans do not have access to the publication due to continued issues with broad internet access and the government's ability to control its availability and functionality.

History 
14ymedio starts as personal project of its founder: Yoani Sánchez, the founder 'Generación Y', a blog that now has about a thousand published texts and more than a million comments. Its main objective is "to inform, to open space for debate, to respect those who think differently, and to harmonize free speech with civic responsibility". For its initial funding, the newspaper received approximately $150.000 in private investment.

The first edition of 14ymedio was focused on a wide variety of topics, including politics, culture and society. It offered a critique to the Cuban healthcare system and questioned the status of baseball as the national sport. Its cover included the story "Red Dawn: Havana is killing out there", by Víctor Ariel González, in which violence in the capital of the island is discussed; an opinion article about the economic reforms promoted by Raúl Castro, written by the dissident blogger Miriam Celaya.

Three hours after 14ymedio published its first edition on the internet, the site was hacked. Those who tried to access the site were redirected to a webpage titled "Yoani$landia", which mentioned that Cubans are tired about the fact that Yoani Sánchez tries to portray herself as the 'Mother Teresa of Calcutta' of the Cuban dissidents.
Internet technicians later on tested it was ETECSA, the communications monopoly of the Cuban government, that hacked the page. From places outside Cuba, users can access the site without any restriction.

Recognizing that restricting access to the site was an initiative of the Cuban government, Yoani Sánchez published in her Twitter account: "Wrong strategy from the Cuban government. There is nothing more attractive than the forbidden".

The actions of the Cuban government against 14ymedio have provoked various reactions in the international arena. The Inter American Press Association (IAPA) blamed the Cuban government for restricting the access to the site and promoting censorship. They claimed that the government's actions show that Cuban rulers still believe that "freedom of expression is a grant and not a human right". Roberta Jacobson, the Assistant Secretary of State for Western Hemisphere Affairs, condemned the blockade on her Twitter account too.

Despite these actions against the newspaper, 14ymedio has not stopped publishing daily since the day of its release. The site showed consistency in its publications and growth in terms of the number of people it reached. By May 2014, 14ymedio had reached 6,000 followers on Facebook and 11,500 on Twitter.

14ymedio has also been internationally recognized by a variety of leading international newspapers and media outlets. Al-Jazeera highlighted that 14ymedio is "the first independent media outlet in Cuba in 50 years to test the Castro regime's tolerance for dissent". BBC considered that 14ymedio will  "contribute with information so that Cubans can decide with more maturity their own destinies", while Vice News described the newspaper as "a new player in town in the homogenous media landscape of the communist island that is already testing the limits of the government's strict controls on the digital sphere".

Content 
Currently, 14ymedio publishes more than a dozen of articles per day. It publishes both original content and international news that come from other agencies, such as:
 International news, through agreements and partnerships with other news agencies
 National news and pictures
 Debates, which include a wide variety of topics ranging from domestic and international politics to social and cultural events
 Photogalleries, which show the reality of Cuba through pictures
 Interviews with national and international figures such as Joe Biden, Mario Vargas Llosa, Lech Walesa, etc.
 Cultural events, through a comprehensive cultural agenda with events that are happening every month in Havana and other provinces
 Market prices, where the prices of basic goods in various markets of Cuba are published

14ymedio reports in real time on national and international events that may be relevant to those living in Cuba. Similarly, it seeks to inform those living outside Cuba about the situation in the island. When Cuba and the United States announced the normalization of their diplomatic relations in December 2014, 14ymedio was the only independent newspaper present in Cuba, reporting on the news and reactions in real time. The articles that were published by 14ymedio were quoted in major newspapers and media outlets such as  The New York Times, The Washington Post, Time Magazine, El País, and others. Similarly, 14ymedio was a vital source of information during Roberta Jacobson's visit to Cuba. The Assistant Secretary of State even visited the headquarters of 14ymedio in Havana.

As a consequence of the positive response that the newspaper received from the public, the team decided to launch an English Edition, to allow non-Spanish speaking readers to receive information directly from Cuba, about the restoration of diplomatic relations with the United States as well as about the general situation of the island. The English Edition of 14ymedio works thanks to the collaboration of volunteer translators, who are responsible of translating the articles that might be relevant for people in the United States or in other English speaking countries.

14ymedio's team 
14ymedio's team is directed by Yoani Sánchez, and operates from her apartment in Cuba. It is conformed by 12 reporters and collaborators. Some of the members of the team are  Lilianne Ruiz; Luz Escobar, Reinaldo Escobar's daughter; and Víctor Ariel González, son of the dissident blogger Miriam Celaya.

By the end of 2014, several members of 14ymedio's team were arrested. Reinaldo Escobar, for example, was detained as he left his own apartment; he was handcuffed and taken to patrol n.628, that was waiting for him in front of the building. Víctor Ariel González was also detained for a couple hours. During that day, Yoani Sánchez remained under house arrest.

Editorial line 
14ymedio seeks to counter the monopoly of the official media, and believes that the press plays an important role in the formation of civic consciousness and the conquest of freedom. The members of the team insist that 14ymedio is not a blog or a newspaper from the opposition. They define 14ymedio as a way to balance the flood of official information by neutrally emphasizing on the issues that the government does not want to inform.

Victor Ariel González said that the newspaper is born with the idea that someday there will be a democracy in Cuba, and that people will read 14ymedio and say: "well, this newspaper has been publishing since those times when it was prohibited to do so". Similarly, Sánchez explained that 14ymedio has the promise of being independent and transparent, and claimed that she chose online journalism over politics, in order to express her criticism on the Cuban current system, rather than participating in politics as a member of the opposition.

Cuban government position towards 14ymedio 
According to the Granma, the official newspaper of Cuba, the purpose of 14ymedio is to "feed campaigns of disinformation and defamation against Cuba". The Cuban government also affirmed that 14ymedio is one of the projects of rebellion that the United States government funds and support in Cuba.

Recognition 
14ymedio's work is now potentiated with the 'Yahoo! Fellowship' that Yoani Sánchez obtained from Georgetown University, in recognition of her work towards the promotion of online freedom of expression. 'Yahoo! Fellow' is a research scholarship on International Values, Communications, Technology and the Global Internet that will allow Sánchez to share her experience of launching an online newspaper in a closed society. Sánchez expressed that the fellowship at Georgetown is an opportunity for her to improve the quality of her own work, to empower independent journalism in Cuba, and to interact with students and faculty in order to broaden her perspective of the world and of Cuba itself.

References 

Censorship in Cuba
Internet properties established in 2014
Cuban news websites
2014 establishments in Cuba